Malaxis brachystachys  is a North American species of orchid native to Mexico, Central America, and the southwestern United States (Arizona). It usually has only one leaf, though occasionally two. Flowers are small and green, in a flat-topped array.

References

External links

photo of herbarium specimen at University of Texas, collected in Coahuila in 1995

Flora of Mexico
Flora of Arizona
Flora of Central America
Plants described in 1849
brachystachys